Anand Singh Dangi was a member of the Haryana Legislative Assembly from the Indian National Congress representing the Meham Vidhan sabha Constituency in Haryana.

References 

Living people
Members of the Haryana Legislative Assembly
Janata Dal politicians
Indian National Congress politicians from Haryana
People from Jind
1952 births